Bhula Na Dena is a 1981 Hindi film starring Helen and Jayshree T.

Cast 
 Rakesh Roshan
 Kajal Kiran
 Sujit Kumar
 Shekhar Kapur
 Helen
 Jayshree T.

Music
All songs were written by Amit Khanna, while "D Le Gayi" was penned by Shaily Shailendra. 

"Sikho To Sikhaye Tumhe Pyar Ka Sabak, Bhula Na Dena" - Shailendra Singh, Chandrani Mukherjee
"Batli Wali Ne" - Amit Kumar
"Dil Humne Jise" - Asha Bhosle
"Dil Le Gayi" - Bappi Lahiri
"Socha Na Samjha" - Asha Bhosle

References

External links

1981 films
1980s Hindi-language films
Films scored by Bappi Lahiri